Serono was a biotechnology company headquartered in Geneva, Switzerland. It was acquired by the German pharmaceutical company Merck in 2006. The company was founded as the Serono Pharmacological Institute by Cesare Serono in 1906 in Rome, Italy.  
A key step in its development was the discovery of a method of extracting urinary gonadotropins by Dr. Piero Donini. Serono was incorporated in 1987 and the holding company, Ares-Serono S.A., changed its name to Serono S.A. in May 2000.

Serono develops and markets pharmaceuticals in the fields of reproductive health, multiple sclerosis, growth & metabolism and dermatology.

The eight biotechnology products are available in four core therapeutic areas: neurology for the treatment of relapsing forms of multiple sclerosis, reproductive health for treatments of infertility, dermatology, where Serono has launched  biologics in Europe for moderate-to-severe psoriasis, and
growth and metabolism  for treatments for HIV-associated wasting and growth deficiencies.

The company also conducts research in oncology and autoimmune diseases. Through the acquisition in 1997 of GBRI from GlaxoWelcome, becoming its Geneva based research institute named SPRI, and the Manteia Predictive Medicine spin-off, Serono also nursed the emergence of now a commercial leading massive parallel sequencing technology.

Sale to Merck KGaA

36% of Serono was sold to Merck KGaA in Sept. 2006 for €10.6 billion; Merck KGaA paid CHF 1,100 for each share. The new entity, which merges Serono with Merck's Ethicals division, is called Merck Serono. Its headquarters was in Geneva, within the new Serono facilities. The US operations remain near Boston and was renamed here EMD Serono due to trademark issues with Merck & Co./MSD. The process of merging started in January 2007 after various business regulatory reviews and phases were complete. Until that time, Serono and Merck KGaA operated as separate entities. The new, combined entity,  Merck Serono is the size of other large biotechs. In 2011, a decision was made to close the Geneva headquarters and move the headquarters to Darmstadt, Germany resulting in job losses to most of the employees in Geneva.

Facilities
Serono operated in 44 countries, with manufacturing facilities in eight countries and sales in over 90 countries. Main manufacturing sites were in Switzerland, Italy, Spain and France; a fifth facility in Israel was closed in 2004 owing to its obsolescence. Research and development facilities were maintained in Geneva, Switzerland, Boston, USA, and Ivrea, Italy. It employed over 4,750 people with worldwide revenues of USD 2,586.4 million (2005). It had eight biotechnology products on the market, and more than 25 ongoing preclinical and clinical development projects at the end of 2005.
Serono Headquarters and the Geneva research site moved to a brand new campus (Horizon Secheron) in the heart of Geneva in 2006. This facility and the headquarters were closed by Merck KGaA in 2013. The building was sold back to Berterelli family.

Lawsuit

In 2005, Serono agreed to a $704 million settlement with the Department of Justice to resolve civil and criminal allegations that the company engaged in a fraudulent scheme to promote the drug Serostim for off-label uses and paid out illegal kickbacks for prescribing the drug in violation of the False Claims Act. The settlement is, to date, the ninth largest pharmaceutical settlement in U.S. history.

Fertility LifeLines
Serono provides Fertility LifeLines as a free and confidential source of information to infertility patients.

Notes and references
  2002 Form 20-F. Retrieved July 3, 2005.
  2004 Form 20-F. Retrieved July 3, 2005.

See also 
 List of pharmaceutical companies
 Pharmaceutical industry in Switzerland

External links
 
 Merck KGaA corporate homepage
 Serono Pharmaceutical Company Intelligence

Selected Company Websites
 Austria
 Canada
 Czech Republic
 France
 Germany
 Greece
 Italy
 Israel
 Japan
 Korea
 Switzerland
 Taiwan
 USA
  

Merck Group
Biotechnology companies of Switzerland
Pharmaceutical companies of Switzerland
Defunct companies of Switzerland
Pharmaceutical companies established in 1906
Manufacturing companies based in Geneva
Pharmaceutical companies disestablished in 2006
Biotechnology companies disestablished in 2006
2006 mergers and acquisitions
Swiss companies established in 1906
Italian companies established in 1906
Swiss companies disestablished in 2006